I Am Not a Witch is a 2017 internationally co-produced drama film written and directed by Rungano Nyoni in her feature debut film. It was screened in the Directors' Fortnight section at the 2017 Cannes Film Festival and won the BAFTA Award for Outstanding Debut by a British Writer, Director or Producer for Nyoni and producer Emily Morgan at the 71st British Academy Film Awards. It was selected as the British entry for the Best Foreign Language Film at the 91st Academy Awards, but it was not nominated.

Plot
A serious little girl shows up in a village and it is quickly decided she is a witch. When she refuses to answer questions confirming or denying she is a witch, she is taken to a witch doctor who sacrifices a chicken to determine whether she is a witch or not. Believing she is a witch, the local authorities take her to a small camp made up of elderly witches, each of whom is tied to their own large spool of white ribbon. The girl is restrained with a ribbon like the other witches and forced into labour. One of the elder witches names her Shula.

Shula is taken away to adjudicate at a trial where an elderly man has claimed that money has been stolen from him. When the suspects are lined up Shula does not know which one is the thief and calls the other witches who give her contradictory advice on how to catch the thief. Nevertheless, Shula is able to correctly guess who the thief is and is rewarded for it. A senior government employee and his wife continue to exploit other people's belief that Shula is a witch by asking her to perform tasks like summoning rainfall. Shula is gradually exposed to what the wider community thinks of witches and is occasionally threatened with violence.

After an appearance on a chat show, where a caller asks why she is not in school, she is sent to a school, but once there the other pupils, like Shula, are those that have been deemed unacceptable for mainstream schools. A witch doctor and a farmer drag her away from the school by her ribbon and ask her to make it rain. She performs a rain dance and exhausts herself trying to produce results. That evening the women back at camp ask her why she is unhappy and in response she says that she wishes she had opted to become a goat. When the women are asleep she's seen leaving the tent and gathering her ribbon to its end.

In the morning two men dump a body in the field and the 'witches' are seen mourning for Shula, although it's ambiguous how she died or whether it is her body. As the women celebrate her death it begins to rain. The truck that carries the women around is shown to be empty, and the ribbons that held them hostage are flying free.

Cast
 Maggie Mulubwa as Shula
 Nellie Munamonga as Police Officer
 Dyna Mufuni as Leader
 Nancy Murilo as Charity
 Becky Ngoma as Bwalya

Production

Writer-director Rungano Nyoni was inspired by actual stories of witchcraft accusations in Zambia. In her research for the film, she traveled to Ghana and spent time in a real witch camp, observing their daily life and rituals.

Reception
On review aggregator Rotten Tomatoes, the film has an approval rating of 96% based on 78 reviews, with an average rating of 7.50/10. On Metacritic, the film has a weighted average score of 79 out of 100, based on 19 critics, indicating "generally favorable reviews".

Mark Kermode from The Observer gave the film four out of five stars, praising Nyoni's work, David Gallego's cinematography and Mulubwa's performance and wrote: "Rungano Nyoni’s debut feature, the story of a girl in Zambia accused of witchcraft, is comic, tragic – and captivatingly beautiful" Jessica Kiang from Variety, also praised Gallego’s cinematography and stated: "Nyoni’s approach may itself be a little too chaotic, and a little too oblique to be fully comprehensible (in particular her counterpointing music cues can overreach, and some of the narrative ellipses confuse). But in the investigation of the dichotomies of ancient and modern, familiar and alien, prosaic and mystical, she clearly has a great deal she wants to say, and now, thanks to this invigorating, intriguing and provocative debut, she has a whole career ahead of her in which to say it".

Anna Smith, writing for Time Out, gave I Am Not a Witch four out of five stars, stating "impressively, debut writer-director Rungano Nyoni makes this heady mix work". Stephen Dalton from The Hollywood Reporter called the film "A winningly original and stylistically fresh debut feature from the young Zambia-born Welsh director Rungano Nyoni, I Am Not a Witch is one of the more buzzy premieres screening in the Directors' Fortnight in Cannes. A fable-like story about a young African girl banished from her village for alleged witchcraft, it blends deadpan humor with light surrealism, vivid visuals and left-field musical choices".

Accolades
I Am Not a Witch gathered several wins and nominations in many important film festivals and film awards, including a win at the 71st British Academy Film Awards for Outstanding Debut by a British Writer, Director or Producer and 10 nominations and three wins at the British Independent Film Awards 2017. It won Feature Fiction award at the 2017 Adelaide Film Festival.

See also
 List of submissions to the 91st Academy Awards for Best Foreign Language Film
 List of British submissions for the Academy Award for Best Foreign Language Film

References

External links
 

2017 films
2017 drama films
British drama films
French drama films
German drama films
Zambian drama films
BAFTA winners (films)
Films about witchcraft
2017 directorial debut films
2010s English-language films
2010s British films
2010s French films
2010s German films